Stop Islamisation of Norway (SIAN) is a Norwegian anti-Muslim group that was established in 2008, although its history goes back to a group started in 2000. Its stated aim is to work against Islam, which it defines as a totalitarian political ideology that violates the Norwegian Constitution as well as democratic and human values. The organisation is currently led by, formerly by Arne Tumyr, and has several thousand members and supporters.

By mid-2011, it was reported that the organisation had close to 13,000 members or "likes" on its Facebook group, although it gathered only a modest attendance at its meetings and demonstrations. The organisation itself had in excess of 3,000 members, mainly based in Oslo but followed by Stavanger. These figures made it by far the biggest organisation of the Stop Islamisation of Europe counter-jihad network.

In 2012 SIAN broke with the mother organisation Stop Islamisation of Europe.

History

The predecessor to SIAN was started in early 2000 as the Action Committee Against Prayer Calling (Aksjonskomiteen mot bønnerop), originally to protest against a request by the Islamic Cultural Centre to broadcast the Adhan (prayer calling) at a local Oslo Mosque using loudspeakers.

On 11 September 2000, the group changed its name to Forum Against Islamisation (Forum mot islamisering, FOMI). In November 2000, about a dozen members of FOMI held a demonstration against Adhan from Mosques in Norway and Islamisation. Legislation to ban Adhan by loudspeakers was proposed in parliament by Carl I. Hagen and the Progress Party, but was voted down by all other parties. In 2004, the two Jewish founders of the Norwegian Israel Centre were expelled from the Mosaic Religious Community (Jewish community of Oslo), after they had joined FOMI and the Democrats party for the annual commemoration of the Kristallnacht.  Former resistance fighter Erik Gjems-Onstad was the internal meeting leader of FOMI from 2001 to 2009.

As a new series of "Stop Islamisation" groups started become established around Europe, the name was on 16 February 2008 changed to its current name, Stop Islamisation of Norway.

SIAN was joined by Gjems-Onstad, and the leader of the Norwegian Patriots, Øyvind Heian in May 2009 for an anti-Islamism demonstration in Oslo. They were heavily outnumbered by counter-demonstrators. Tumyr also compared Muslim immigration to Norway with the Nazi invasion of Norway in 1940. In June 2009, SIAN was again joined by Heian for a demonstration in Oslo. The Blitz movement and the Red Party in turn held an illegal counter-demonstration, against what they called "Nazis and racists". Both demonstrations developed into minor street clashes.

Tumyr and SIAN were joined by the leader of the Democrats party, Vidar Kleppe, for speeches when SIAN held an arrangement in Bergen in August 2010. SOS Rasisme held a counter-demonstration at the event. On 11 September, SIAN held a commemoration of the September 11 terror attacks, and were joined by Anders Gravers Pedersen of Stop Islamisation of Europe. Some groups of SOS Rasisme and Blitz movement activists tried to disrupt the event.

The leader of the local Nordstrand chapter of the Socialist Left Party in Oslo, Morten Schau, joined SIAN to much controversy in January 2011. He resigned from the Socialist Left Party later the same day, after the leader of the Oslo chapter deemed membership of SIAN as "incompatible" with being a member of the party.

In February 2011 Walid al-Kubaisi joined a meeting hosted by SIAN, where he held a speech. The Blitz movement demonstrated outside the arrangement, and al-Kubaisi needed police escort to get to the meeting. When questioned about the organisation's relation to the newly emerged Norwegian Defence League, Tumyr stated that their ideology, intent on "stopping Islam" was the same, although their means of expression differed. In 2016, Swedish-Somali activist Mona Walter held a speech for the organisation.

In 2012 there was a split in the organisation after the leader Arne Tumyr refused to cooperate with Norwegian Defense League. SIAN left the mother organisation Stop Islamization of Europe (SIOE), while former board member Kaspar Birkeland formed a new organisation SION that is associated with SIOE.

As Lars Thorsen became leader of the group in 2019, SIAN has started to repeatedly burn the Quran at their rallies. After a Quran burning event in July 2022, a vehicle with five SIAN-activists including Thorsen was deliberately crashed into, causing their vehicle to be flipped around onto its roof. A woman was arrested after the attack.

Organisation

Local radio
In March 2012, the local chapter of SIAN in Rogaland (the organisation's largest chapter) started a local radio show in Sandnes on the Radio Kos channel. The channel's internet radio in turn had to increase its capacity from 25,000 listeners to 200,000 due to high traffic around the same time.

Views by commentators
In a comment in Aftenposten in 2004, Jahn Otto Johansen called the former FOMI "extremely Muslim-hostile." The then secretary general of the Norwegian Humanist Association, Lars Gule, has also stated that the organisation "uses a hateful and vulgar language with a clearly discriminating content." In December 2005, the court decision against NHA fell in the case of libel initiated by the leader of SIAN, Arne Tumyr, after the former chair woman of the NHA board publicly had characterised a letter to the editor from Tumyr as "racist". Ingunn Økland of Aftenposten has criticized the use both by SIAN and its opponents of labelling each other "Nazi" in the Islam debate.

On the other hand, Iraqi refugee and writer Walid al-Kubaisi has made appearances in the organisation, and in the feature story "Norway for Norwegians" (Norge for nordmenn) in Klassekampen in 2005 stated that "the forum showed a variation of thoughts and opinions within the frame of fear of Islamism. The fear of Islamism is healthy and legitimate for the population of Europe, and in the Muslim world.

See also
 Stop Islamisation of Europe
 Stop Islamisation of Denmark
 Norwegian Defence League
 Criticism of Islam
 Islamophobia

References

External links
Official website

 
Counter-jihad
Far-right politics in Norway
Political advocacy groups in Norway
Organizations established in 2008
2008 establishments in Norway